

Swithwulf (died between 867 and 896) was a medieval Bishop of London.

Swithwulf was consecrated between 867 and 896. He died between 867 and 896.

Citations

References

External links
 

Bishops of London
Year of birth missing
9th-century deaths
9th-century English bishops